Momoko Takahashi (Japanese: 高橋萌木子; born 16 November 1988 in Saitama) is a Japanese track and field athlete who specialises in sprinting events. She has represented Japan twice at the World Championships in Athletics (2007 and 2009) and won relay medals at the Asian Games in both 2006 and 2010. She was the 200 m gold medallist at the 2009 Asian Athletics Championships.

A Japanese junior record holder, she is the country's second fastest ever runner over both 100 metres and 200 metres, behind Chisato Fukushima. Her bests for the events are 11.32 seconds and 23.15 seconds, respectively. She is a joint holder of the Japanese record in the 4×100 metres relay.

Career

While studying at Saitama Sakae High School, she represented the school in the sprints and in 2005 she won the 100 metres at the national high school championships and then the 200 metres at the National Sports Festival of Japan. In 2006, she established herself with a Japanese junior and high school record of 11.54 seconds for the 100 metres. A third place in the event at that year's Japanese Athletics Championships brought her selection for the 2006 Asian Games. She was sixth in the 100 m final and won a silver medal with the Japanese women's 4×100 metres relay team, finishing behind China.

Takahashi claimed her first national title at the 2007 Japanese Championships, reaching the top of the podium in the women's 100 m. She competed at the 2007 Summer Universiade and ran the 100 m individual and relay events at Osaka's 2007 World Championships in Athletics, although she did not make it past the heats in either competition. She won a relay medal at the 2007 Asian Athletics Championships that year, as the Japanese were runners-up to Thailand. The 2008 season was not as productive for her, as she was fourth nationally and did not get selected for the 2008 Beijing Olympics, but she did improve her 200 m best to 23.48 seconds.

The 2009 Japanese Championships showed a resurgence in Takahashi's form: she was second to Chisato Fukushima's national record run over 200 m, but took the 100 m title after her rival withdrew with an injury. Competing on the world stage for a second time, she ran in the heats of the 100 m, 200 m, and 4×100 m relay of the 2009 World Championships. A medal came at the 2009 Summer Universiade (100 m silver) and she ended the year as the continental champion, having won gold medals in the 200 m and relay at the 2009 Asian Athletics Championships. These performances were part of a Japanese sweep of the women's sprints, as her teammates Fukushima and Asami Tanno won the 100 m and 400 metres titles respectively. Takahashi also set her first Japanese national record that year, as she anchored home a 4 × 100 m relay team of Saori Kitakaze, Fukushima and Mayumi Watanabe in a time of 43.58 seconds at the Osaka Grand Prix.

The 2010 Japanese nationals saw a reversal of the previous year, as Takahashi won the 200 m but was runner-up to Fukushima over 100 m. She was one of the Asia-Pacific team's representatives at the 2010 IAAF Continental Cup, but she finished last in the 200 m, while the Japanese women's relay team that she anchored met a similar fate. She did not manage an individual medal at the 2010 Asian Games in November (coming fourth and sixth in the 100 m and 200 m finals), but she helped a Japanese quartet claim a bronze medal in the short relay.

Her 2011 began with a new national relay record at the Seiko Golden Grand Prix, where she, Saori Kitakaze, Fukushima and Kana Ichikawa knocked nearly two-tenths off the previous time with their run of 43.39 seconds.

International competitions

References

External links

Profile from JAAF 

Living people
1988 births
Sportspeople from Saitama (city)
Japanese female sprinters
Asian Games silver medalists for Japan
Asian Games bronze medalists for Japan
Asian Games medalists in athletics (track and field)
Athletes (track and field) at the 2006 Asian Games
Athletes (track and field) at the 2010 Asian Games
Medalists at the 2006 Asian Games
Medalists at the 2010 Asian Games
Universiade medalists in athletics (track and field)
Universiade silver medalists for Japan
Japan Championships in Athletics winners
Fujitsu people
Competitors at the 2007 Summer Universiade
Medalists at the 2009 Summer Universiade